John Hollywood Millar Easdale (16 January 1919 – 4 May 1999) was Scottish footballer who played as a centre half. Easdale died in Ontario, Canada in May 1999 at the age of 80.

References

1919 births
1999 deaths
Association football central defenders
Brighton & Hove Albion F.C. wartime guest players
Dumbarton F.C. wartime guest players
English Football League players
Liverpool F.C. players
Scottish footballers
Stockport County F.C. players